Blue Roads, is a 1947 Soviet drama film directed by Vladimir Braun.

Plot 
Despite the fact that the Great Patriotic War has come to an end, in the depths of the sea there are still German mines. One of them is found in the Odessa port and Captain Ratanov begins to neutralize it. But suddenly it explodes, seriously wounding the captain. Will he be able to return to work?

Starring 
 Pavel Kadochnikov as Sergey Ratanov
 Marina Kalinkina as Nadezhda Ratanova
 Viktor Dobrovolsky as Sergey Konstantinovich
 Mikhail Romanov as Berezhenko
 Sergey Stolyarov as Razgovorov
 Yury Lyubimov as Yuri Vetkin
 Vladimir Osvetsimsky as Captain Konsovsky
 Arkadi Arkadyev as Kalachenko
 Andrei Sova as Sailor

References

External links 
 

1947 films
1940s Russian-language films
Soviet war drama films
1940s war drama films
Soviet black-and-white films
1947 drama films